Darcy,  Darci or Darcey may refer to:

Science
 Darcy's law, which describes the flow of a fluid through porous material
 Darcy (unit), a unit of permeability of fluids in porous material
 Darcy friction factor in the field of fluid mechanics
 Darcy–Weisbach equation used in hydraulics for calculation of the head loss due to friction

People

 Darcy (surname), a surname (including a list of people with the name)

Men
 Darcy Blake (born 1988), Welsh footballer
 Darcy Dallas (born 1972), Canadian ice hockey defenceman
 Darcy Daniher (born 1989), Australian rules footballer
 Darci Frigo, Brazilian activist
 Darcy Furber, Canadian politician
 Darcy Gardiner (born 1995), Australian rules footballer
 Darcy Hordichuk (born 1980), professional ice hockey player
 Darcy Kuemper (born 1990), professional ice hockey player
 Darcy Lang (born 1995), Australian rules footballer
 Darcy Lear (1898–1967), Australian rules footballer
 Darcy Lussick (born 1989), Australian rugby league player
 Darcy McDougall (1886–1952), Australian rules footballer
 Darci Miguel Monteiro (1968-2018), Brazilian footballer
 Darcy Ribeiro, (1922–1997), Brazilian anthropologist and politician
 Darcy Tucker (born 1975), professional ice hockey player

Women
 Darcey Bussell (born 1969), English ballerina
 Darci Lynne (born 2004), American singing ventriloquist
 Darci Kistler (born 1964), American ballet dancer
 Darcy LaPier (born 1965), American actress 
 Darcy Sterling (born 1969), American actress

Fictional characters
 Mr. Darcy, from Jane Austen's novel Pride and Prejudice
 Mark Darcy, from Helen Fielding's novel Bridget Jones's Diary
 Lord Darcy (character), a detective created by Randall Garrett
 Diane Darcy, racing car driver, in Herbie Goes to Monte Carlo
 Darcy Edwards, student on Degrassi: The Next Generation
 Darcy (Winx club), a witch from animated series Winx Club
 Darcy Doll, an android companion created by the Toyman in Superman: The Animated Series
 Darcy Hudson, a character in the Australian drama series A Country Practice
 Darcy Lewis, a character in the Marvel Cinematic Universe

Other uses
 Darcy v. Allein, the first court case to result in a judgement against monopoly
 Darci, a doll in the Groovy Girls line

See also
 D'arcy (disambiguation)
 Darcie, a feminine given name
 Baron Darcy (disambiguation)
 

Unisex given names
English unisex given names